John Jellett may refer to:
 John Hewitt Jellett, Irish mathematician
 John Holmes Jellett, British civil engineer